The Ponte Vecchio ("Old Bridge") is a medieval stone closed-spandrel segmental arch bridge over the Arno River, in Florence, Italy. The only bridge in Florence spared from destruction during the Second World War, it is noted for the shops built along it; building shops on such bridges was once a common practice. Butchers, tanners, and farmers initially occupied the shops; the present tenants are jewelers, art dealers, and souvenir sellers.  The Ponte Vecchio's two neighboring bridges are the Ponte Santa Trinita and the Ponte alle Grazie.

The bridge connects via Por Santa Maria (Lungarno degli Acciaiuoli and Lungarno degli Archibusieri) to via de 'Guicciardini (Borgo San Jacopo and via de' Bardi).

The name was given to what was the oldest Florentine bridge when the bridge to the Carraia was built, then called "Ponte Nuovo" in contrast to the pons Vetus. Beyond the historical value, the bridge over time has played a central role in the city road system, starting from when it connected the Roman Florentia with the Via Cassia Nuova commissioned by the emperor Hadrian in 123 AD.

In contemporary times, despite being closed to vehicular traffic, the bridge is crossed by a considerable pedestrian flow generated both by the notoriety of the place itself and by the fact that it connects places of high tourist interest on the two banks of the river: piazza del Duomo, piazza della Signoria on one side with the area of Palazzo Pitti and Santo Spirito in the Oltrarno.

The bridge appears in the list drawn up in 1901 by the General Directorate of Antiquities and Fine Arts, as a monumental building to be considered national artistic heritage.

History and construction
The bridge spans the Arno at its narrowest point where it is believed that a bridge was first built in Roman times, when the via Cassia crossed the river at this point. The Roman piers were of stone, the superstructure of wood. The bridge first appears in a document of 996 and was destroyed by a flood in 1117 and reconstructed in stone. In 1218 the Ponte alla Carraia, a wooden structure, was established nearby which led to it being referred to as "Ponte Nuovo" relative to the older (Vecchio) structure. It was swept away again in 1333 except for two of its central piers, as noted by Giovanni Villani in his Nuova Cronica. It was rebuilt in 1345.

Giorgio Vasari recorded the traditional view of his day that attributed its design to Taddeo Gaddi— besides Giotto one of the few artistic names of the trecento still recalled two hundred years later. Modern historians present Neri di Fioravanti as a possible candidate as builder.

Sheltered in a little loggia at the central opening of the bridge is a weathered dedication stone, which once read Nel trentatrè dopo il mille-trecento, il ponte cadde, per diluvio dell' acque: poi dieci anni, come al Comun piacque, rifatto fu con questo adornamento. The Torre dei Mannelli was built at the southeast corner of the bridge to defend it.

The bridge consists of three segmental arches: the main arch has a span of  the two side arches each span . The rise of the arches is between 3.5 and 4.4 meters (11½ to 14½ feet), and the span-to-rise ratio 5:1. The shallow segmental arches, which require fewer piers than the semicircular arch traditionally used by Romans, enabled ease of access and navigation for animal-drawn carts. Another notable design element is the large piazza at the center of the bridge that Leon Battista Alberti described as a prominent ornament in the city.

A stone with an inscription from Dante (Paradiso xvi. 140-7) records the spot at the entrance to the bridge where Buondelmonte de' Buondelmonti was murdered by the Amidei clan in 1215, which began the urban fighting of the Guelfs and Ghibellines.

The bridge has always hosted shops and merchants  who displayed their goods on tables before their premises, after authorization by the Bargello (a sort of a lord mayor, a magistrate and a police authority).

Later additions and changes 

In order to connect the Palazzo Vecchio (Florence's town hall) with the Palazzo Pitti, in 1565 Cosimo I de' Medici had Giorgio Vasari build the Vasari Corridor, part of which runs above the Ponte Vecchio.

To enhance the prestige and clean up the bridge, a decree was made in 1595 that excluded butchers from this bridge (only goldsmiths and jewelers are allowed) that is in effect to this day. The association of butchers had monopolized the shops on the bridge since 1442.

The back shops (retrobotteghe) that may be seen from upriver were added in the seventeenth century.

20th century
In 1900, to honor and mark the fourth century of the birth of the great Florentine sculptor and master goldsmith Benvenuto Cellini, the leading goldsmiths of the bridge commissioned the Florentine sculptor, Raffaello Romanelli, to create a bronze bust of Cellini to stand atop a fountain in the middle of the Eastern side of the bridge, where it stands to this day.

During World War II, the Ponte Vecchio was not destroyed by the German army during their retreat at the advance of the British 8th Army on 4 August 1944, unlike all the other bridges in Florence. This was, according to many locals and tour guides, because of an express order by Hitler. Access to the Ponte Vecchio was, however, obstructed by the destruction of the buildings at both ends of the bridge, which have since been rebuilt using a combination of original and modern designs.

The bridge was severely damaged in the 1966 flood of the Arno.

Between 2005 and 2006, 5,500 padlocks, known as love locks, which were attached to the railings around the bust of Cellini, were removed by the city council. According to the council, the padlocks were aesthetically displeasing and damaged the bust and its railings. There is now a fine for attaching love locks to the bridge.

Panorama

In art
 The bridge is mentioned in the aria "O mio babbino caro" by Giacomo Puccini.
 Wall mural in Grossi Florentino, executed by students of Napier Waller under supervision

 A fountain pen company Visconti from Firenze has a clip in their pens which is inspired by the arc in Ponte Vecchio bridge. Source

See also

 Krämerbrücke
 Pulteney Bridge

Notes

References
 Chiarugi, Andrea, Foraboschi, Paolo, "Maintenance of the Ponte Vecchio historical bridge in Florence," in: Extending the Lifespan of Structures, Vol. 2,  IABSE Symposium Report, San Francisco 1995, pp. 1479–1484
 Dupré, Judith, Bridges: A History of the World's Most Spectacular Spans, Hachette/Black Dog & Leventhal Press, New York 2017, 
 Flanigan, Theresa, "The Ponte Vecchio and the Art of Urban Planning in Late Medieval Florence," Gesta 47, 2008, pp. 1–15.
 Fletcher, Banister: A History of Architecture, The Butterworth Group, London 1987, pp. 756–757
 Graf, Bernhard, Bridges that Changed the World, Prestel, Munich 2002, pp. 38–39

External links
 
 "Ponte Vecchio, Florence" on travel website Numberonestars.com (archived in 2007)
 Short text about Ponte Vecchio on private tourist website Travel-to-Florence.com

Buildings and structures completed in 1345
Deck arch bridges
Bridges in Florence
Jewellery districts
Shopping districts and streets in Italy
Stone bridges in Italy
Tourist attractions in Florence
Bridges completed in the 14th century
Bridges with buildings
Covered bridges in Italy